Tadeusz Lutoborski (6 June 1926 – 10 April 2010) was a Polish activist and representative of the Katyn families.

He died in the 2010 Polish Air Force Tu-154 crash near Smolensk on 10 April 2010. He was posthumously awarded the Order of Polonia Restituta.

References

1926 births
2010 deaths
Federation of Katyn Families
Polish economists
Warsaw Uprising insurgents
Home Army members
Polish United Workers' Party members
University of Warsaw alumni
SGH Warsaw School of Economics alumni
Knights of the Order of Polonia Restituta
Burials at Powązki Cemetery
Victims of the Smolensk air disaster
Child soldiers in World War II